Potyvirus is a genus of positive-strand RNA viruses in the family Potyviridae. Plants serve as natural hosts. The genus is named after member virus potato virus Y. Potyviruses account for about thirty percent of the currently known plant viruses. Like begomoviruses, members of this genus may cause significant losses in agricultural, pastoral, horticultural, and ornamental crops. More than 200 species of aphids spread potyviruses, and most are from the subfamily Aphidinae (genera Macrosiphum and Myzus). The genus contains 190 species.

Virology

Structure 

The virion is non-enveloped with a flexuous and filamentous nucleocapsid, 680 to 900 nanometers (nm) long and is 11–20 nm in diameter. The nucleocapsid contains around 2000 copies of the capsid protein. The symmetry of the nucleocapsid is helical with a pitch of 3.4 nm.

Genome 

The genome is a linear, positive-sense, single-stranded RNA ranging in size from 9,000–12,000 nucleotide bases. Most potyviruses have non-segmented genomes, though a number of species are bipartite. The base composition is: 21–23.51–26% G; 23–30.15–44% A; 14.9–22.41–28% C; 15.6–24.41–30.9% U.

In the species with a single genome, at the 5' end a protein is covalently linked (the VPg protein). It encodes a single open reading frame (ORF) expressed as a 350 kDa polyprotein precursor. This is processed into ten smaller proteins: protein 1 protease (P1-Pro), helper component protease (HC-Pro), protein 3 (P3), cylindrical inclusion (CI), viral protein genome-linked (Vpg), nuclear inclusion A (NIa), nuclear inclusion B (NIb), capsid protein (CP) and two small putative proteins known as 6K1 and 6K2. The P3 cistron also encodes a second protein—P3N-PIPO—which is generated by a +2 frameshift.

Proteins 

Properties of the viral protein:

P1-Pro (~33 kiloDaltons (kDa) in molecular weight) is a serine protease.

HC-Pro (~52 KDa) is a protease that is also involved in aphid transmission. As a protease it cleaves a glycine-glycine dipeptide at its own C-terminus. It also interacts with eukaryotic initiation factor 4 (eIF4). It acts as a viral RNA silencing suppressor.

P3 (~41 kDa) the function is not known. It interacts with large subunit of the ribulose-1,5-bisphosphate carboxylase/oxygenase.

CI (~71 kDa) is an RNA helicase with ATPase activity. It is also involved in membrane attachment.

NIa (~50 kDa) is cleaved into NIa-Pro a protease (~27 kDa) and the VPg (~22 kDa) protein.

NIb (~59 kDa) is an RNA-dependent RNA polymerase.

6K1 (~6 kDa) the function is not known. 6K2 (~6 kDa) protein, having a single trans membrane domain, is accumulating in the host cellular membranes and is thought to play a role in forming the replication vesicles of the virus.

P3N-PIPO (~25 kDa) the function is not known but it appears to be essential. It interacts with both the large and small subunits of the ribulose-1,5-bisphosphate carboxylase/oxygenase.

CP the capsid protein ranges between 30 and 35 kDa in weight.

Pretty interesting sweet potato potyviral ORF (PISPO), Alkylation B (AlkB), and inosine triphosphate pyrophosphatase (known as ITPase or HAM1) are protein domains identified in atypical potyviruses.

VPg protein interacts with eukaryotic initiation factor 4E (eIF4E). This interaction appears to be essential to viral infectivity. Two proteases, P1 and the helper component protease (HC) catalyse only autoproteolytic reactions at their respective C termini. The remaining cleavage reactions are catalysed by either trans-proteolytic or autoproteolytic mechanisms by the small nuclear inclusion protein (NIa-Pro). This latter protein is an evolutionary homology of the picornavirus 3C proteinase.

Life cycle

Replication may occur in the cytoplasm, nuclei, chloroplasts, Golgi apparatus, cell vacuoles or more rarely in unusual sites.

Potyviruses make proteinaceous inclusions in infected plant cells.  These may be crystals in either the cytoplasm or in the nucleus, as amorphous X-bodies, membranous bodies, viroplasms or pinwheels. The inclusions may or may not (depending on the species) contain virions. These inclusions can be seen in the light microscope in leaf strips of infected plant tissue stained with Orange-Green (protein stain) but not Azure A (nucleic acid stain). There are four different kinds of potyvirus inclusions.

Replication follows the positive-stranded RNA virus replication model. Positive-stranded RNA virus transcription is the method of transcription. Translation takes place by -1 ribosomal frameshifting. The virus exits the host cell by tubule-guided viral movement. Plants serve as the natural host. The virus is transmitted via a vector (insects). Transmission routes are vector and mechanical.

Evolution

Potyviruses evolved between 6,600 and 7,250 years ago. They appear to have evolved in southwest Eurasia or north Africa. The estimated mutation rate is about 1.15 nucleotide substitutions/site/year.

Geographical spread
Agriculture was introduced into Australia in the 18th century. This introduction also included plant pathogens. Thirty eight potyvirus species have been isolated in Australia. Eighteen potyviruses have been found only in Australia and are presumed to be endemic there. The remaining twenty appear to have been introduced with agriculture.

Taxonomy

Potyvirus contains the following species:

 African eggplant mosaic virus
 Algerian watermelon mosaic virus
 Alstroemeria mosaic virus
 Alternanthera mild mosaic virus
 Amaranthus leaf mottle virus
 Amazon lily mosaic virus
 Angelica virus Y
 Apium virus Y
 Araujia mosaic virus
 Arracacha mottle virus
 Asparagus virus 1
 Banana bract mosaic virus
 Barbacena virus Y
 Basella rugose mosaic virus
 Bean common mosaic necrosis virus
 Bean common mosaic virus
 Bean yellow mosaic virus
 Beet mosaic virus
 Begonia flower breaking virus
 Bidens mosaic virus
 Bidens mottle virus
 Blue squill virus A
 Brugmansia mosaic virus
 Brugmansia suaveolens mottle virus
 Butterfly flower mosaic virus
 Calanthe mild mosaic virus
 Calla lily latent virus
 Callistephus mottle virus
 Canna yellow streak virus
 Carnation vein mottle virus
 Carrot thin leaf virus
 Carrot virus Y
 Catharanthus mosaic virus
 Celery mosaic virus
 Ceratobium mosaic virus
 Chilli ringspot virus
 Chilli veinal mottle virus
 Chinese artichoke mosaic virus
 Clitoria virus Y
 Clover yellow vein virus
 Cocksfoot streak virus
 Colombian datura virus
 Commelina mosaic virus
 Costus stripe mosaic virus
 Cowpea aphid-borne mosaic virus
 Cucurbit vein banding virus
 Cypripedium virus Y
 Cyrtanthus elatus virus A
 Daphne mosaic virus
 Daphne virus Y
 Dasheen mosaic virus
 Datura shoestring virus
 Dendrobium chlorotic mosaic virus
 Dioscorea mosaic virus
 Diuris virus Y
 Donkey orchid virus A
 East Asian Passiflora distortion virus
 East Asian Passiflora virus
 Endive necrotic mosaic virus
 Euphorbia ringspot virus
 Freesia mosaic virus
 Fritillary virus Y
 Gloriosa stripe mosaic virus
 Gomphocarpus mosaic virus
 Habenaria mosaic virus
 Hardenbergia mosaic virus
 Henbane mosaic virus
 Hibbertia virus Y
 Hippeastrum mosaic virus
 Hyacinth mosaic virus
 Impatiens flower break virus
 Iris fulva mosaic virus
 Iris mild mosaic virus
 Iris severe mosaic virus
 Japanese yam mosaic virus
 Jasmine virus T
 Johnsongrass mosaic virus
 Kalanchoe mosaic virus
 Keunjorong mosaic virus
 Konjac mosaic virus
 Leek yellow stripe virus
 Lettuce Italian necrotic virus
 Lettuce mosaic virus
 Lily mottle virus
 Lily virus Y
 Lupinus mosaic virus
 Lycoris mild mottle virus
 Maize dwarf mosaic virus
 Malva vein clearing virus
 Mashua virus Y
 Meadow saffron breaking virus
 Mediterranean ruda virus
 Moroccan watermelon mosaic virus
 Narcissus degeneration virus
 Narcissus late season yellows virus
 Narcissus yellow stripe virus
 Nerine yellow stripe virus
 Noni mosaic virus
 Nothoscordum mosaic virus
 Onion yellow dwarf virus
 Ornithogalum mosaic virus
 Ornithogalum virus 2
 Ornithogalum virus 3
 Panax virus Y
 Papaya leaf distortion mosaic virus
 Papaya ringspot virus
 Paris mosaic necrosis virus
 Paris virus 1
 Parsnip mosaic virus
 Passiflora chlorosis virus
 Passiflora mottle virus
 Passion fruit woodiness virus
 Pea seed-borne mosaic virus
 Peanut mottle virus
 Pecan mosaic-associated virus
 Pennisetum mosaic virus
 Pepper mottle virus
 Pepper severe mosaic virus
 Pepper veinal mottle virus
 Pepper yellow mosaic virus
 Peru tomato mosaic virus
 Pfaffia mosaic virus
 Platycodon mild mottle virus
 Pleione flower breaking virus
 Pleione virus Y
 Plum pox virus
 Pokeweed mosaic virus
 Potato virus A
 Potato virus V
 Potato virus Y
 Potato yellow blotch virus
 Ranunculus leaf distortion virus
 Ranunculus mild mosaic virus
 Ranunculus mosaic virus
 Rhopalanthe virus Y
 Saffron latent virus
 Sarcochilus virus Y
 Scallion mosaic virus
 Shallot yellow stripe virus
 Sorghum mosaic virus
 Soybean mosaic virus
 Spiranthes mosaic virus 3
 Sudan watermelon mosaic virus
 Sugarcane mosaic virus
 Sunflower chlorotic mottle virus
 Sunflower mild mosaic virus
 Sunflower mosaic virus
 Sunflower ring blotch virus
 Sweet potato feathery mottle virus
 Sweet potato latent virus
 Sweet potato mild speckling virus
 Sweet potato virus 2
 Sweet potato virus C
 Sweet potato virus G
 Tamarillo leaf malformation virus
 Telfairia mosaic virus
 Telosma mosaic virus
 Thunberg fritillary mosaic virus
 Tobacco etch virus
 Tobacco mosqueado virus
 Tobacco vein banding mosaic virus
 Tobacco vein mottling virus
 Tomato necrotic stunt virus
 Tradescantia mild mosaic virus
 Tuberose mild mosaic virus
 Tuberose mild mottle virus
 Tulip breaking virus
 Tulip mosaic virus
 Turnip mosaic virus
 Twisted-stalk chlorotic streak virus
 Ugandan passiflora virus
 Vallota mosaic virus
 Vanilla distortion mosaic virus
 Verbena virus Y
 Watermelon leaf mottle virus
 Watermelon mosaic virus
 Wild melon banding virus
 Wild onion symptomless virus
 Wild potato mosaic virus
 Wild tomato mosaic virus
 Wisteria vein mosaic virus
 Yam mild mosaic virus
 Yam mosaic virus
 Yambean mosaic virus
 Zantedeschia mild mosaic virus
 Zea mosaic virus
 Zucchini shoestring virus
 Zucchini tigre mosaic virus
 Zucchini yellow fleck virus
 Zucchini yellow mosaic virus

A further four viruses were previously classified as species in this genus but were abolished due to lack of genetic sequence information:

 Cowpea green vein banding virus
 Groundnut eyespot virus
 Helenium virus Y
 Tropaeolum mosaic virus

Species groups
Potyviruses were further divided into the PVY, SCMV, BYMV, BCMV species groups in 1992. Gibbs and Ohshima 2010 produced a more extensive molecular phylogeny with the same four, but also several new groups: the BtMV, ChVMV, DaMV, OYDV, PRSV, TEV, and TuMV.

PVY
Contains 16 species including the type species of the genus (potato virus Y). The primary hosts are: Nine Solanaceae, three Amaranthus, three Asteraceae, one Lilium, and one Amaryllis.

References

Bibliography

External links
 UniProt taxonomy: Potyvirus
 Viralzone: Potyvirus
 ICTV

Virus genera
Potyviruses
Viral plant pathogens and diseases